American System may refer to:

 American System (economic plan), an 1800s economic program of Henry Clay and the Whig Party based on the "American School" ideas of Alexander Hamilton
 American system, an informal name for the Universal Numbering System dental notation introduced in the US in the 1800s
 American system of manufacturing, a set of manufacturing methods that evolved in the 19th century in the US
American system passenger coach or "open coach", a style of railway passenger coach first introduced in the 1800s in the US
 United States customary units, a system of measurement used in the US